Helgustadir mine is a mine in the east of Iceland where Iceland spar (a form of transparent calcite) was mined from the mid-17th century to the 20th century. It is the source of the largest and clearest known Iceland spar specimen and the source of most museum specimens of Iceland spar.

It was declared a nature reserve in 1975.

About

Location 

The mine is located near Eskifjörður, east of Iceland. Helgustadir mine consists of two mines, known as the upper and lower mine.

Uses 
Crystals from this area are known for exceptional clarity, leading to the mineral being named "Iceland spar".

Iceland spar from Helgustadir mine was used in optical devices used in physics, chemistry, and geology, most importantly Nicol prisms.

Nature reserve 
The nature reserve is 0.9 hectares. Since 2010, it has been on the Environment Agency of Iceland's red list of areas that are likely to lose their protection status.

Theft of crystals 
Being a nature reserve, tampering with the rock formations and removing crystals is forbidden. Despite that, visitors often take samples with them, causing a disruption of the area. The problem has gotten worse as tourism has increased, with some visitors filling their backpacks with samples.

References

Further reading 
 

Mines in Europe
Geology of Iceland
Protected areas of Iceland